The 1959 12-Hour Florida International Grand Prix of Endurance for the Amoco Trophy was a motor race for sportscars, staged on 21 March at the Sebring International Raceway, Florida, United States. It was the opening round of the 1959 World Sportscar Championship and was the eighth running of the 12 Hours of Sebring.

The race was won by Dan Gurney, Phil Hill, Chuck Daigh and Olivier Gendebien driving a Ferrari 250 TR 59 for Scuderia Ferrari.

Report

Entry

A massive total of 81 racing cars were registered for this event, of which 74 arrived for practice. Only these, 65 qualified for, and started the race. Reigning champions, Ferrari had eight of their new 250 TRs in Florida, of which three were works machines (1959 model) for  their squad of drivers; Phil Hill, Dan Gurney, Chuck Daigh, Olivier Gendebien, Jean Behra and Cliff Allison. Their main opposition would come from a single works Aston Martin.

David Brown sent just one Aston Martin DBR1/300 over from England for Carroll Shelby and Roy Salvadori. Also on the entry list were some quick looking Lister-Jaguar entered by Briggs Cunningham with himself, Walt Hansgen and Stirling Moss amongst their squad. The work outfit also brought a car for Moss and paired him with Ivor Bueb.

Qualifying

Because there were no qualifying sessions to set the grid, the starting positions were decided according to engine size with the 3.0 litre Aston Martin DBR1 of Shelby and Salvadori being given first place.

Race

Most of the 40,000 spectators expected a battle for sole Aston Martin and the Ferrari. Although early on, there was a great scrap, the Aston retired after just 32 laps with gear lever problems. This meant it really was a Ferrari battle at the front of the field for almost all the race. The official result lists the winner as the no. 7 Ferrari of Gurney, Daigh, Hill and Gendebien, but that's not the whole story.

For the opening four and half hours, the Ferrari of Hill and Gendebien led until suffering from a broken differential. That put the Gurney/Daigh car in front. Behra/Allison were in second, followed by Moss/Bueb. And then the heavy rain arrived and the race became intriguing. With cars sliding off all over the place, one of the most dramatic accidents come just after the six-hour mark when Robert Rollason’s Stanguellini 750 Sport collided with a pole that supported a bridge. The car hit the pole while sideways throwing it up into the air before splitting in half, and ending up on its roof. It required a number of track marshals to flip it back onto its wheels, so that Rollason could escape uninjured.

The conditions made it difficult for even the very best to keep their cars under control. The works Lister-Jaguar with Moss behind the wheel, despite struggling for most of the race, came alive and moved up through the field passing both the Ferraris. After five hours, Moss led Behra and by now the little Porsche of Wolfgang von Trips and Jo Bonnier had moved into third. At this time, Scuderia Ferrari decided to call on the experience of Hill and Gendebien and added them the Gurney/Daigh car. Although the fans were not happy, this was a team event and Ferrari wanted to win. Then Moss was disqualified for illegal refuelling.

With the better drivers now driving the no.7, Hill passed Behra for the lead and the car held on to first place until the flag dropped. After 12 hours of racing, the Scuderia Ferrari of Gurney, Daigh, Hill and Gendebien won ahead of their team-mates Behra and Allison. Car number 7, took an impressive victory, completing 188 laps, covering 977.6 miles after 12 hours of racing, averaging a speed of 81.181mph. Second place went to the second Ferrari, albeit one lap adrift. The podium was complete by works Porsche of von Trips and Bonnier who were four laps behind the winners.

Official Classification

Class Winners are in Bold text.

 Fastest Lap: Jean Behra, 3:21.6secs (92.857 mph)

Class Winners

Standings after the race

Note: Only the top five positions are included in this set of standings.

Championship points were awarded for the first six places in each race in the order of 8-6-4-3-2-1. Manufacturers were only awarded points for their highest finishing car with no points awarded for positions filled by additional cars. Only the best 3 results out of the 5 races could be retained by each manufacturer. Points earned but not counted towards the championship totals are listed within brackets in the above table.

References

Further reading

Alec Ulmann. The Sebring Story. Chilton Book Company. ASIN B0006CUAP2.

12 Hours of Sebring
Sebring
Sebring
Sebring
Sebring